Ableh-ye Olya (also Romanized as Ābleh-ye ‘Olyā; also known as Ābleh-ye Bālā) is a village in Holayjan Rural District, in the Central District of Izeh County, Khuzestan Province, Iran. At the 2006 census, its population was 50, in 9 families.

References 

Populated places in Izeh County